Bahi Ladgham (10 January 1913 – 13 April 1998) was a Tunisian politician who served as the Secretary of Presidency from 1957 to 1969 (de facto prime minister) and the Prime Minister of Tunisia from 7 November 1969 to 2 November 1970.

Biography 
He is the son of Ahmed Ladgham, himself the son of a Libyan immigrant from Misrata to settle in Tunisia in the mid-nineteenth century because of a local revolt against the Ottoman presence, and a Tunisian woman the Kachoukh family of the Sahel, Zohra Ben Aouda, daughter of Algerian immigrants from Médéa who fled the French repression of supporters of Emir Abdelkader; she dies when he is only eight and a half.

Coming from a modest family living in the Tunisian district of Bab El Akouas, Bahi Ladgham lives in a cultural atmosphere where Tunisians of different origins mix. He studied at the kouttab of his neighborhood before entering Sadiki College in 1921 at the age of eight, on the advice of a friend of his father, Hassen Chadli. Brilliant throughout his studies, he received several awards and congratulations from his teachers, including Mohamed Tahar Ben Achour and Mohamed Salah Mzali.

After the First World War, the backroom of his father is a place for debate and discussion around political and cultural themes: the fall of the Ottoman Empire, the de-Islamization of Turkey by Mustafa Kemal Atatürk, the struggle of Libyan nationalists against Italy but especially the situation of Tunisia with the foundation of Destour by Abdelaziz Thâalbi in 1920.

Also an adept reader, this context leads him to want to revolt against the French occupier.

References

1913 births
1998 deaths
People from Tunis
Socialist Destourian Party politicians
Prime Ministers of Tunisia
Finance ministers of Tunisia
20th-century Tunisian people